The Statistical Society of Canada (abbreviated as SSC) is a professional organization whose mission is to promote the use and development of statistics and probability.

Its objectives are
 to make the general public aware of the value of statistical thought, the importance of this science and the contribution of statisticians to Canadian society;
 to ensure that decisions that could have a major impact on Canadian society are based on relevant data, interpreted properly using statistics;
 to promote the pursuit of excellence in training and statistical practice in Canada;
 to encourage improvements in statistical methodology;
 to maintain a sense of belonging within the profession, and to promote dialogue among theoreticians and practitioners of statistics.

Each year the SSC awards the CRM-SSC Prize, in collaboration with the Centre de Recherches Mathématiques, to an exceptional young Canadian statistician.

Publisher of 
Canadian Journal of Statistics

Arms

See also
President of the Statistical Society of Canada

References

External links
Official website

Statistical societies
Higher education in Canada
Professional associations based in Canada
Learned societies of Canada